Margaret Chisholm may refer to:

 Margaret E. Chisholm (1921–1999), American librarian and educator
 Margaret Covey Chisholm (1909–1965), American portrait painter and muralist